Gerhard Winkler (1906–1977) was a German songwriter. His best-known song was "Mütterlein", co-written with Fred Rauch which became "Answer Me" in the English text of Carl Sigman. 
In the Netherlands it was translated in Dutch by Bob Scholte : Moeder mijn, Moeder mijn. Other songs he wrote include Heute wie for tausend Jahren, Alles ist Bestimmung im Leben!, Mach Dir um mich doch bitte keine Sorgen, Mowe, du fliegst in die Heimat, and Capri-Fischer.

Selected filmography
 Monika (1938)
 King of Hearts (1947)
 Southern Nights (1953)
 My Leopold (1955)
 The Beautiful Master (1956)
 Black Forest Melody (1956)
 In Bed by Eight (1965)

References

1906 births
1977 deaths
20th-century German composers
Recipients of the Order of Merit of the Federal Republic of Germany